Mick Holden (3 October 1954 – 26 September 2007) was a Gaelic footballer and hurler for Dublin and Cuala CLG.

Playing career
Holden was on the 1983 All-Ireland winning Dublin side that defeated Galway by a scoreline of 1–10 to 1–8. He also played with the Dublin hurlers and won the Railway Cup with Leinster in 1979. Six years later, he became one of the few players to win the Railway Cup in both codes, when he was a member of the victorious Leinster football panel.

Death
Holden died suddenly on the morning of 26 September 2007.

References

External links
 Official Club Website
 History Of Cuala CLG
 Official Dublin Website
 Official GAA Website
 Fans Tributes

1954 births
2007 deaths
Cuala Gaelic footballers
Cuala hurlers
Dual players
Dublin inter-county Gaelic footballers
Dublin inter-county hurlers
Gaelic football backs
People from Dún Laoghaire
Sportspeople from Dún Laoghaire–Rathdown
Winners of one All-Ireland medal (Gaelic football)